Johannes "Jan" van Aartsen (15 September 1909 – 3 February 1992) was a Dutch politician of the defunct Anti-Revolutionary Party (ARP) now merged into the Christian Democratic Appeal (CDA) party and jurist.

Van Aartsen applied at the Free University Amsterdam in June 1931 majoring in law and obtaining a Bachelor of Laws degree before graduating with a Master of Laws degree in July 1936. Van Aartsen worked as a lawyer in The Hague from August 1936 until October 1944. On 10 May 1940 Nazi Germany invaded the Netherlands and the government fled to London to escape the German occupation. During World War II Van Aartsen continued to work as a lawyer. Van Aartsen worked as a trade association executive for the Christian Employers' association (NCW) from October 1944 until September 1949 and served as General-Secretary from July 1947 until September 1949. Van Aartsen served on the Municipal Council of The Hague from May 1948 until November 1958 and served as an Alderman in The Hague from September 1949 until November 1958. Van Aartsen was appointed as Minister of Transport and Water Management in the Cabinet Drees III following the resignation of Jacob Algera, taking office on 1 November 1958. The Cabinet Drees III fell on 11 December 1958 and continued to serve in a demissionary capacity until it was replaced by the caretaker Cabinet Beel II with Van Aartsen continuing as Minister of Transport and Water Management, taking office on 22 December 1958. Van Aartsen was elected as a Member of the House of Representatives after the election of 1959, taking office on 20 March 1959. Following the cabinet formation of 1959 Van Aartsen was appointed as Minister of Housing and Construction in the Cabinet De Quay, taking office on 19 May 1959. In December 1962 Van Aartsen announced that he wouldn't not stand for the election of 1963. Following the cabinet formation of 1963 Van Aartsen was again appointed as Minister of Transport and Water Management in the Cabinet Marijnen, taking office on 24 July 1963. The Cabinet Marijnen fell on 27 February 1965 and continued to serve in a demissionary capacity until the cabinet formation of 1965, Van Aartsen was not giving a cabinet post in the new cabinet, the Cabinet Marijnen was replaced by the Cabinet Cals on 14 April 1965.

Van Aartsen remained in active politics, in May 1965 Van Aartsen was nominated as Queen's Commissioner of Zeeland, serving from 1 June 1965 until 1 October 1974.

Career
Van Aartsen was a lawyer in The Hague and a member of the Anti Revolutionary Party. He became minister of Transportation and Water Management of the Netherlands in November 1958, at the end of the fourth cabinet of Prime Minister Willem Drees. From 1959 to 1963 he was minister of Housing and the Construction Industry in the cabinet-De Quay. Under Prime Minister De Quay's successor Victor Marijnen, Van Aartsen returned to the post of Transportation and Water Management. In 1965, Van Aartsen was appointed Queen's Commissioner of the province of Zeeland, where he would remain until 1974.

Personal life
Van Aartsen was the father of Jozias van Aartsen, who became foreign minister of the Netherlands in 1998. He died at age 82 in 1992 and is buried at Zorgvlied cemetery.

Decorations

References

External links

Official
  Mr. J. (Jan) van Aartsen Parlement & Politiek

 

1909 births
1992 deaths
Aldermen of The Hague
Anti-Revolutionary Party politicians
Commanders of the Order of Leopold II
Commanders of the Order of the Netherlands Lion
Dutch members of the Dutch Reformed Church
Dutch trade association executives
Grand Officers of the Order of Orange-Nassau
King's and Queen's Commissioners of Zeeland
Ministers of Housing and Spatial Planning of the Netherlands
Ministers of Transport and Water Management of the Netherlands
Members of the House of Representatives (Netherlands)
Municipal councillors of The Hague
Officiers of the Légion d'honneur
Politicians from Amsterdam
People from Vlissingen
Reformed Churches Christians from the Netherlands
Vrije Universiteit Amsterdam alumni
20th-century Dutch civil servants
20th-century Dutch lawyers
20th-century Dutch politicians